The Puerto Rico Department of Labor and Human Resources (PRDLHR); is an executive department of the government of Puerto Rico. The DLHR is responsible for setting and implementing public policy in the areas of labor relations, occupational safety, unemployment insurance benefits, re-employment services, and human resources training in the U.S. Commonwealth of Puerto Rico. The Department is also responsible for some economic statistics.

History
The department is an executive department of the Government of Puerto Rico. It was created in 1931 but only gained formal recognition when the Constitution of the Commonwealth of Puerto Rico was approved in 1952. Its first secretary was Prudencio Rivera. The incumbent is Carlos Saavedra Gutiérrez.

Secretary

External links
 Departamento del Trabajo y Recursos Humanos - Official Site

References

Executive departments of the government of Puerto Rico
Puerto Rico